Air Marshal Wilfred Austin Curtis, OC, CB, CBE, DSC & Bar, ED, CD (21 August 1893 – 14 August 1977) was a Canadian airman and Chief of the Air Staff of the Royal Canadian Air Force (RCAF) from 1947 until 1953.

Early years
He was born in Havelock, Ontario, having received his early education in Toronto.

First World War
He then joined the infantry of the Canadian Expeditionary Force in 1915; he graduated on 11 August 1916 and joining the Royal Naval Air Service (RNAS) as a fighter pilot.

In 1917 Curtis was promoted to captain and awarded the Distinguished Service Cross (United Kingdom) (DSC) for his skill and courage. The award citation read:

In 1918, Curtis was awarded a Bar to the DSC.

He proved his worth as a highly successful fighter pilot by shooting down 13 enemy aircraft confirmed; his final tally was 4 enemy planes destroyed, 3 of which were shared victories; also, he drove down 9 enemy planes out of control, one of which was shared.

He transferred to the Royal Air Force (RAF) in April 1918.

Interwar years
On his return to Canada he maintained his interest in military as well as civil aviation. During the late 1920s and early 1930s, he served as an officer in the Toronto Scottish Regiment Reserve.  For some time there were no available non-permanent military aviation positions.  However, when the opportunity presented itself in 1933, he became involved in the formation of No. 10 (Army Co-operation) Squadron.  Curtis became Officer Commanding in 1935 and initiated experimental air operations in mid-northern Ontario.

Second World War
Wing Commander Curtis was called to active duty in the RCAF on 1 September 1939 and became deputy air officer commanding, RCAF Overseas Headquarters in London in 1941. He became a member of the Air Council in 1944.

Post-war years
The singular success that marks his air force career in wartime decisions was rewarded by his appointment in 1947 as Chief of the Air Staff.  In this appointment he guided the RCAF through the difficult stages of reorganization which followed the war and through the expansion of Canada's participation in the Korean War and the North Atlantic Treaty Organization (NATO).  He received French, American and Italian decorations in recognition of his contributions.  He remained Chief of the Air Staff until his retirement in January 1953.

On his retirement from the RCAF he accepted the position of Vice-Chairman of Hawker Siddeley Canada, where he continued to have a substantial impact on the development of aviation in Canada. He always devoted time to other aviation concerns: was President of the RCAF Association for two years until he was appointed Grand President of that organization, founded and organized the Canadian National Air Show in 1939 and served as chairman of its scholarship fund and was appointed the Honorary Wing Commander of the No. 400 (City of Toronto) Squadron.

Other interests included the chairmanship of the committee that formed York University, of which he was elected Chancellor in 1960. He served as Chairman of the Canadian Opera Company and President of the Canadian Inter American Association.

The Air Marshal had a great interest in the development of the Canadian aircraft industry.  During his term of office, he continually and successfully directed his efforts to secure money for experimental work on and production of a jet trainer and twin engine fighters, the CF-100 Canuck and the CF-105 Arrow suitable for interception operations in the northern Canadian climate.  Early in the Cold War, he convinced the cabinet that the RCAF should make a major contribution to NATO.  This resulted in an air division of twelve F-86 Sabre squadrons being dispatched to Europe.  This major contribution of 300 front line aircraft was the principal air defense force on that continent during the 1950s.

If there could be named a "Father of Canada's Post War Air Force", Wilfred Curtis would be the outstanding nominee.  Through his drive, interpersonal skills, sense of humor, compassionate understanding of aviation and effective leadership, the RCAF became a well-knit, effective and efficient fighting force.  He materially contributed to the glorious saga of Canada's military and industrial aviation accomplishments.

Awards and decorations
 Companion, Order of the Bath (C.B.) (1946)
 Commander, Order of the British Empire (C.B.E.) (1943)
 Distinguished Service Cross with bar (1917 & 1918)
 Efficiency Decoration (1945)
 Canadian Forces Decoration (C.D.)
 Order of Canada (O.C.) (1967)
 Canada's Aviation Hall of Fame (1973)
 Honorary Doctor of Laws from York University (LL.D.) (1968)

References

 Above the Trenches: A Complete Record of the Fighter Aces and Units of the British Empire Air Forces 1915-1920 Christopher F. Shores, Norman L. R. Franks, Russell Guest. Grub Street, 1990. , .

External links
 Canada's Aviation Hall of Fame official site
 Canada's 25 Most Renowned Military Leaders

|-

1893 births
1977 deaths
Royal Canadian Air Force officers
Canadian Aviation Hall of Fame inductees
Chancellors of York University
Canadian military personnel of World War I
Royal Canadian Air Force air marshals of World War II
Canadian Commanders of the Order of the British Empire
Canadian Companions of the Order of the Bath
Officers of the Order of Canada
People from Peterborough County
Canadian recipients of the Distinguished Service Cross (United Kingdom)
Royal Naval Air Service aviators